Balis Ridge (‘Rid Balis’ \'rid ba-'lis\ is the rocky, partly ice-covered ridge extending 7 km in southeast-northwest direction, 1.9 km wide and rising to 1292 m in the north foothills of Forbidden Plateau on Danco Coast in Graham Land, Antarctica.  It surmounts Rozier Glacier to the northeast, Montgolfier Glacier to the southwest, and Wilhelmina Bay and its southwesterly part Piccard Cove to the northwest where the ridge ends in Sophie Cliff.

The ridge is named after the Thracian god Balis.

Location
British mapping in 1980.

Maps
British Antarctic Territory. Scale 1:200000 topographic map. DOS 610 Series, Sheet W 64 62. Directorate of Overseas Surveys, Tolworth, UK, 1980.
 Antarctic Digital Database (ADD). Scale 1:250000 topographic map of Antarctica. Scientific Committee on Antarctic Research (SCAR). Since 1993, regularly upgraded and updated.

Notes

References
 Bulgarian Antarctic Gazetteer. Antarctic Place-names Commission. (details in Bulgarian, basic data in English)
Balis Ridge. SCAR Composite Gazetteer of Antarctica.

External links
 Balis Ridge. Copernix satellite image

Ridges of Graham Land
Bulgaria and the Antarctic
Danco Coast